Eisenberg is a Verbandsgemeinde ("collective municipality") in the Donnersbergkreis, in Rhineland-Palatinate, Germany. The seat of the Verbandsgemeinde is in Eisenberg.

The Verbandsgemeinde Eisenberg consists of the following Ortsgemeinden ("local municipalities"):

 Eisenberg
 Kerzenheim 
 Ramsen

Verbandsgemeinde in Rhineland-Palatinate